An afterimage is an optical illusion that occurs after looking away from a direct gaze at an image.

Afterimage or after image may also refer to:

Film and television
 Afterimage (film), a 2016 Polish film
 "Afterimage" (Star Trek: Deep Space Nine), a television episode

Music
 AfterImage (band), a Filipino pop/rock band
 The Afterimage, a Canadian metal band
 "Afterimage" (song), by Rush, 1984

Print
 Afterimage (novel), a 2007 crime novel by Kathleen George
 After Image, a 2006 novel by Pierce Askegren based on the television series Buffy the Vampire Slayer
Afterimage, a 2000 novel by Helen Humphreys
Afterimage, a novel by Kristine Kathryn Rusch and Kevin J. Anderson
 Afterimage (magazine), an American art magazine